Middleton Grange is a suburb of Sydney, in the state of New South Wales, Australia. Middleton Grange is located 40 kilometres west of the Sydney central business district, in the local government area of the City of Liverpool and is part of the Greater Western Sydney region.

Middleton Grange consists of approx 2550 lots with provision made by Council. Major land developers are now developing and selling housing blocks (around 700 lots), along with some smaller land individual holders/farmers.

Middleton Grange has recycled water and high Council infrastructure contributions.

History
The suburb was officially created in 2005. Middleton Grange was considered by Liverpool City Council for rezoning to residential lots in the early 1990s. This progressed with lobbying by the land owners and other interested parties until Liverpool City Council started moving forward in 1999.

LandPro Corporation, together with land owners continued to push the issue, attending numerous Council meetings until rezoning was achieved in 2005, with the Council acquiring land for drainage and other services, including sewer upgrading works (completed by Sydney Water).

Manta Group Pty Ltd who own the Middleton Grange Town Centre, Managing Director Rene Licata has worked on the Middleton Grange Town project since 2003 with Stateland Developments. In 2005 Rene Licata, wanted a more meaningful suburb name as it was known as South Hoxton Park. Due to the area's proximity to Hoxton Park Airport Rene Licata looked for a new name amongst prominent Australian aviation heroes.

Rene discovered the story of Rowden 'Ron' Middleton who was on the 29th mission in Turin, Italy during World War II when his plane was shot. With his crew injured he managed to fly the crippled plane back to England but could not land so he forced his crew out in parachutes to save them and flew out to sea where his plane crashed and he died. He became the first fighter pilot to receive the Victoria Cross for bravery during World War II. Rene also was able to name the streets names also to promote the areas heritage with Lockheed Ave, Cessna St and Qantas Boulevard just a few of the aptly-named streets.

Rene Licata was able to return with new investors in 2014 to realise his dream and his vision for the new suburb. Liverpool City Council recommended the new revamped Master Plan for approval to the Gateway NSW Government on 15 December 2015 to have the site approved for park lands, 1000 apartments and 36,000sqm of mixed use, retail & commercial areas.

Demographics
In Middleton Grange, 55.3% of people were born in Australia. The most common countries of birth were Iraq 9.7%, Fiji 3.1%, Philippines 2.6%, Vietnam 1.7% and New Zealand 1.3%.

The most common ancestries in Middleton Grange were Australian 11.9%, Italian 8.2%, Assyrian 7.9%, English 7.7% and Indian 4.1%.

The most common responses for religion were Catholic 39.3%, No Religion 9.5%, Not stated 8.5%, Islam 7.1% and Eastern Orthodox 5.5%.

Education
The area is serviced by two schools – Middleton Grange Public School opened in 2009 and Thomas Hassall Anglican College opened in 2000 and caters for pre school through to year 12.

Places of worship and culture
The suburb is home to a prominent Assyrian church, St Zaia Cathedral, which is part of the Ancient Church of the East, an Eastern Christian denomination that follows the East Syriac Rite. It was established in 1996. The church's liturgical language is in Assyrian Neo-Aramaic and Syriac.

The Serbian Cultural Club, a Serbian social club, is situated in this suburb.

References

Suburbs of Sydney
City of Liverpool (New South Wales)